Fired Wife is a 1943 comedy film directed by Charles Lamont and starring Robert Paige, Diana Barrymore and Louise Allbritton. It was produced and distributed by Universal Pictures. This was one of the final films in Barrymore's short-lived Universal contract.

Cast
Diana Barrymore - Eve Starr
Robert Paige - Hank Dunne
Louise Allbritton - Tabitha 'Tig' Dunne
Walter Abel - Chris McClelland
George Dolenz - Oscar Blix

References

External links

lobby poster

1943 films
American comedy films
Universal Pictures films
Films directed by Charles Lamont
1943 comedy films
Films scored by Frank Skinner
Films based on works by Hagar Wilde
American black-and-white films
1940s American films